James Henry Garland (born December 13, 1931) is an American prelate of the Roman Catholic Church. Garland served as bishop of the Diocese of Marquette in Michigan from 1992 to 2005 and as an auxiliary bishop of the Diocese of Cincinnati in Ohio from 1984 to 1992.

Biography

Early life and education
James Garland was born on December 13, 1931, to a farm family in Wilmington, Ohio. He has four brothers and two sisters.In 1953, Garland graduated from Ohio State University with a Bachelor of Education degree. That same year, he began seminary studies, graduating from Mount Saint Mary’s Seminary of the West in Cincinnati, Ohio, with a Master of Education degree in 1960.  In 1965, Garland received a Master of Social Work degree from the Catholic University of America in Washington, D.C.

Priesthood 
On August 15, 1959, Garland was ordained a priest by Archbishop Karl Alter for the Archdiocese of Cincinnati.After his ordination, Garland was posted to several parishes in the archdiocese. He also directed the Catholic Charities offices in Springfield, Ohio, and Dayton, Ohio, and then the archdiocesan Office of Catholic Charities.

Auxiliary bishop of Cincinnati
On June 2, 1984, Pope John Paul II named Garland as the titular bishop of Garriana and as an auxiliary bishop of the Archdiocese of Cincinnati. He was consecrated on July 25, 1984 at the Cathedral Basilica of St. Peter in Chains in Cincinnati by Archbishop Daniel Pilarczyk. The co-consecraters were Archbishops Nicholas Elko and Edward McCarthy. 

While auxiliary bishop, Garland directed the archdiocesan Departments of Community Services and Pastoral Services.

Bishop of Marquette
On October 6, 1992, John Paul II appointed Garland as the eleventh bishop of the Diocese of Marquette.  He was installed on November 11, 1992

During this time, the diocese celebrated the Jubilee Year 2000.  Events included a diocesan-wide celebration of the Sacrament of Confirmation at the Superior Dome in Marquette, Michigan,, at which 656 youths received the sacrament. An estimated 2,500 people attended a liturgical celebration August 20 at the Mattson Lower Harbor Park, also in Marquette.

Garland was a member of the Administrative Committee of the United States Catholic Conference/National Conference of Catholic Bishops.  He served as chair of the Committee for the Campaign for Human Development from November 1992 to November 1995, and as chair of the bishops of Region VI from November 1995 to November 1997.

Retirement 
On December 13, 2005, John Paul II accepted Garland's letter of resignation as Bishop of Marquette. He was replaced by Bishop Alexander K. Sample.

After retirement, Garland served for two years as executive director of the Bishop Baraga Association.  He writes columns for The U.P. Catholic, presides at confirmations and other events and celebrates mass regularly at the Cathedral Parish and other parishes of the diocese.

See also
 

 Catholic Church hierarchy
 Catholic Church in the United States
 Historical list of the Catholic bishops of the United States
 List of Catholic bishops of the United States
 Lists of patriarchs, archbishops, and bishops

References

External links
Roman Catholic Diocese Of Marquette 
Roman Catholic Archdiocese of Cincinnati

Episcopal succession

1931 births
Living people
20th-century Roman Catholic bishops in the United States
21st-century Roman Catholic bishops in the United States
Ohio State University alumni
People from Wilmington, Ohio
People from Marquette, Michigan
Roman Catholic bishops of Marquette
The Athenaeum of Ohio alumni
Catholic University of America alumni
Catholics from Ohio